Superman is an NES video game by Kemco based on the DC Comics character. The Japanese release featured a synthesized version of the 1978 film's score, but in the US version, these songs are replaced by music recycled from Indora no Hikari.

Gameplay
In the game, the player controls Superman on a quest to save the city of Metropolis from the evil Lex Luthor and a gang of criminals that were exiled from the planet Krypton. The game had an overhead map of various locations in the city that the player can travel to, with animated scenes, but then the gameplay would switch to a more traditional side-scrolling adventure game.

Superman has an energy (Super Power) bar and he can collect various icons in the game to use a limited supply of one of his item powers: x-ray vision (make certain enemies visible), superflight, super spin, heat vision (laser attack), and super breath 1 and super breath 2 (freeze enemies). One of the main difference from the comics was that Superman's x-ray vision was used to make invisible enemies visible. The instruction booklet explained that glitch by claiming that "Superman is now unable to see inside buildings, as Lex has lined all the buildings in Metropolis with lead!" Aside from the item powers, Superman can also jump and punch. Players start out the game as Clark Kent but can change into Superman (provided that they have enough Super Power) by entering into one of the phone booths that are scattered throughout the city. However, taking sufficient damage from enemies would cause Superman to become Clark Kent. Whenever Superman entered the Daily Planet building he would always revert to Clark Kent, no matter what his power level was. The game also came with an area map that split up the districts of Metropolis and allowed Superman to use his superflight power to quickly change areas. Occasionally a "Help!" signal would appear on the map, such as a person being mugged, to which Superman could fly to that area immediately and aid the person in need.

At the end of each city level, or "chapter", the player battles a different boss and, upon defeating the boss, is given an animated front page of a Daily Planet newspaper praising their success. The second to the last chapter boss in the game is Lex Luthor. This is followed by three fights in a row against the exiled criminals from Krypton; Ursa, Non and General Zod at the "Statue of Freedom", which looks like the Statue of Liberty.

References

External links
 
 

1987 video games
Kemco games
Nintendo Entertainment System games
Nintendo Entertainment System-only games
Seika Corporation games
Superman video games
Superhero video games
Video games developed in Japan
Video games set in the United States
Single-player video games